Clout's Wood is an 11.78 hectare biological Site of Special Scientific Interest in Wiltshire, notified in 1951.

The site is managed as a nature reserve by Wiltshire Wildlife Trust.

Sources
 Natural England citation sheet for the site (accessed 23 March 2022)

External links
 Clout's Wood - Wiltshire Wildlife Trust
 Natural England website (SSSI information)

Sites of Special Scientific Interest in Wiltshire
Sites of Special Scientific Interest notified in 1951
Wiltshire Wildlife Trust reserves